Poznań Wschód railway station is a railway station serving the north east of the city of Poznań, in the Greater Poland Voivodeship, Poland. The station is located at the junction of the Warsaw–Kunowice railway, Poznań–Skandawa railway and Poznań–Bydgoszcz railway. The train services are operated by Przewozy Regionalne and Koleje Wielkopolskie.

History
The station used to be known as Poznań Główna after the neighbourhood it lies in, however this caused confusion with the similarly named Poznań Główny railway station, the main station of the city. The station was therefore renamed Poznań Wschodni and later changed to its current name of Poznań Wschod.

Train services
The station is served by the following service(s):

Regional services (R) Poznan - Gniezno - Mogilno - Inowroclaw - Bydgoszcz
Regional services (R) Poznan - Gniezno - Mogilno - Inowroclaw - Torun
Regional services (R) Leszno - Poznan
Regional services (KW) Poznan - Wrzesnia - Konin - Kutno
Regional services (KW) Poznan - Gniezno
Regional services (KW) Poznan - Murowana Goślina - Wągrowiec - Gołańcz

References

 This article is based upon a translation of the Polish language version as of April 2016.

External links
 

Wschód
Railway stations in Greater Poland Voivodeship
Railway stations served by Przewozy Regionalne InterRegio